Bumba lennoni is a species of tarantula found in 2015 in Caxiuanã National Forest. It is about one inch long, small for a tarantula but is closely related to the largest spider in the world.

Origins
This spider lives in northern Brazil, and is named after John Lennon "the legendary creator of The Beatles, who contributed to make this world a gentler place".

Like all tarantulas, the lennon tarantula's ancestors diverged from a common ancestor with the normal, web-spinning spider perhaps 350 million years ago.

Biology
Though very small (about 1 inch), this tarantula shares its genus with relatively large b. horrida, with a five-inch legspan, and has many traits that imply it is closely related to Theraphosa blondi the Goliath birdeater spider, largest known extant spider species

See also
 Ilyodon lennoni
 List of organisms named after famous people (born 1900–1949)

References

Spiders of Brazil
Theraphosidae
Spiders described in 2014
John Lennon